The Tamil Nadu State Film Award for Best Supporting Actress is given by the state government as part of its annual Tamil Nadu State Film Awards for Tamil  (Kollywood) films. The award was first given in 1968 and stopped after 1970. The award is being given after 2000.

The list
Here is a list of the award winners and the films for which they won.

See also
 Tamil cinema
 Cinema of India

References

Actor